Nanorana mokokchungensis (common name: Mokokchung frog) is a species of frog in the family Dicroglossidae. It is endemic to Northeast India and only known from its type locality, Mokokchung in Nagaland.

Description
Nanorana mokokchungensis is a robust-bodied and relatively large frog, reaching  in snout–vent length. The snout is rounded and flattened. The eyes are large. The supra-tympanic fold is glandular, while the tympanum itself is absent. The forearms are robust. The finger tips are swollen but not dilated into discs; no webbing is present. The tibia are long and robust. The toes are moderately webbed and have weakly swollen tips. The dorsum bears large, scattered tubercles. Dorsal colouration is uniformly grey, but the upper eyelids are yellowish-grey. The thighs have diffuse crossbands. The ventral parts are cream with greyish variegations. Males have a subgular vocal sac.

Habitat and conservation
It is a poorly known species; threats to it are unknown. It is protected by national legislation in India.

References

mokokchungensis
Frogs of India
Endemic fauna of India
Amphibians described in 2000
Taxa named by Indraneil Das
Taxonomy articles created by Polbot